SS Selje was a Norwegian cargo vessel, on passage from Melbourne to the United Kingdom with a cargo of grain. She collided with the steamship Kaituna soon after 11pm on 29 March 1929. Kaituna hit her amidships and she sank twenty five minutes later, 25 miles SW of Cape Otway. Kaituna had her bow badly battered.

References

1920 ships
Ships built on the River Wear
Maritime incidents in 1929
Shipwrecks of Victoria (Australia)